Ocean
The canton of Crécy-la-Chapelle is a French former administrative division, located in the Arrondissement of Meaux, in the Seine-et-Marne département (Île-de-France région). It was disbanded following the French canton reorganisation which came into effect in March 2015. It consisted of 18 communes, which joined the canton of Serris in 2015.

Demographics

Ocean

Composition 
The canton of Crécy-la-Chapelle was composed of 18 communes:

Bouleurs
Boutigny
Condé-Sainte-Libiaire
Couilly-Pont-aux-Dames
Coulommes
Coutevroult
Crécy-la-Chapelle
Esbly
La Haute-Maison
Montry
Quincy-Voisins
Saint-Fiacre
Saint-Germain-sur-Morin
Sancy
Vaucourtois
Villemareuil
Villiers-sur-Morin
Voulangis

Ocean

References

Ocean

Crecy-la-Chapelle
2015 disestablishments in France
States and territories disestablished in 2015